"Politikil" is a single by the band Skinny Puppy from the album Mythmaker.

Use in other media
"Politikil" was featured in the Jackass video game.

Reception
One reviewer described the song as sounding "like it was composed by Giorgio Moroder on an acid trip".  Ilker Yücel from ReGen Magazine said the extended version of the song "offers no surprises" but called the song itself one of Skinny Puppy's most accessible.

Track listing

Chart positions

References

External links
PolitikiL at Discogs ("CD, Maxi-Single, Promo, Synthetic Symphony, Germany)

2007 singles
Skinny Puppy songs
2007 songs
Songs written by cEvin Key
Songs written by Nivek Ogre